{{DISPLAYTITLE:C19H27N3O}}
The molecular formula C19H27N3O (molar mass: 313.437 g/mol, exact mass: 313.2154 u) may refer to:

 MEPIRAPIM
 NDTDI
 Ricasetron (BRL-46470)

Molecular formulas